The 1978 Balkans Cup was an edition of the Balkans Cup, a football competition for representative clubs from the Balkan states. It was contested by 6 teams and Rijeka won the trophy.

Group A

Group B

Finals

First leg

Second leg

Rijeka won 4–2 on aggregate.

References

External links 

 RSSSF Archive → Balkans Cup
 
 Mehmet Çelik. "Balkan Cup". Turkish Soccer

1978
1977–78 in European football
1978–79 in European football
1977–78 in Romanian football
1978–79 in Romanian football
1977–78 in Greek football
1978–79 in Greek football
1977–78 in Bulgarian football
1978–79 in Bulgarian football
1977–78 in Turkish football
1978–79 in Turkish football
1977–78 in Yugoslav football
1978–79 in Yugoslav football
1977–78 in Albanian football
1978–79 in Albanian football